Love You to Death is a 2019 crime drama film that aired on Lifetime. The film is inspired by the murder of Dee Dee Blanchard and stars Marcia Gay Harden, Emily Skeggs, Brennan Keel Cook, Garfield Wilson, Kayla Deorksen, Heather Doerksen, and Tate Donovan.

On January 27, 2019, a "special edition" of the film was aired that featured behind-the-scene interviews with Harden and Skeggs.

Plot

Camile Stoller (Marcia Gay Harden) is the mother of a sickly girl named Esme (Emily Skeggs). Their relationship turns fatal when Camile is found to have been stabbed to death and Esme is missing.

Cast
 Marcia Gay Harden as Camile Stoller, a woman who is inspired by Dee Dee Blanchard
 Emily Skeggs as Esme Stoller, the sickly daughter of Camile who is inspired by Gypsy Rose Blanchard. Skeggs had to wear a bald cap in most of the scenes where Esme was hairless
 Nevis Unipan portrays a younger Esme
 Brennan Keel Cook as Scott, the love interest of Esme who is inspired by Nick Godejohn
 Garfield Wilson as Dr. Price
 Kayla Deorksen as Denise
 Heather Doerksen as Dr. Yarrow
 Tate Donovan as Travis Stoller, the estranged father of Esme who is inspired by Rod Blanchard

Production 
Harden was brought on to portray the character of Camile, who is based on Dee Dee Blanchard. Harden was not aware of Blanchard's murder and had not heard of Munchausen's by proxy, whereas her co-star Emily Skeggs was familiar with both as she was a fan of true crime. While filming Skeggs spent about two and a half hours each day getting the bald cap applied to her head while Harden had to wear body padding for portions of the movie.

Release 
Love You To Death first aired on the Lifetime channel on January 26, 2019.

References

External links
 Love You to Death at Lifetime
 

Lifetime (TV network) films
2019 television films
2019 films
2019 crime drama films
American crime drama films
Drama films based on actual events
Films about child abuse
Films about murderers
Films scored by Amie Doherty
American drama television films
2010s English-language films
2010s American films